The 1942 All-Pacific Coast football team consists of American football players chosen by various organizations for All-Pacific Coast teams for the 1942 college football season.   The organizations selecting teams in 1942 included the Associated Press (AP) and the United Press (UP).

UCLA, Washington State, Stanford and USC finished first through fourth, respectively, in the Pacific Coast Conference (PCC), and each of those teams placed two players named on the first teams selected by either the AP or UP.  Conference champion UCLA was ranked #13 in the final AP Poll and was represented by quarterback Bob Waterfield (AP, UP) and guard Jack Lescoulie (AP, UP). Stanford was ranked #12 in the final AP Poll and was represented by guard Chuck Taylor (AP, UP), a College Football Hall of Fame inductee, and tackle Ed Stamm (AP, UP).

Three players from teams outside the PCC received first-team honors from the AP: halfback Jesse Freitas and end Alyn Beals from the Santa Clara Broncos and tackle John Sanchez from the San Francisco Dons.

All-Pacific Coast selections

Quarterback
 Bob Waterfield, UCLA (AP-1; UP-1)

Halfbacks
 Mickey McCardle, USC (AP-1; UP-1)
 Jesse Freitas, Santa Clara (AP-1)
 Tom Roblin, Oregon (UP-1)

Fullback
 Bob Kennedy, Washington State (AP-1; UP-1)

Ends
 John Ferguson, California (AP-1; UP-1)
 Alyn Beals, Santa Clara (AP-1)
 Nick Susoeff, Washington State (UP-1)

Tackles
 Ed Stamm, Stanford (AP-1; UP-1)
 John Sanchez, Univ. of San Francisco (AP-1)
 N. Verry, USC (UP-1)

Guards
 Jack Lescoulie, UCLA (AP-1; UP-1)
 Chuck Taylor, Stanford (AP-1; UP-1) (College Football Hall of Fame)

Centers
 Walt Harrison, Washington (AP-1; UP-1)

Key

AP = Associated Press

UP = United Press

Bold = Consensus first-team selection of both the AP and UP

See also
1942 College Football All-America Team

References

All-Pacific Coast Football Team
All-Pacific Coast football teams
All-Pac-12 Conference football teams